Changara  District is a district of Tete Province in western Mozambique. The principal town is 
Luenha. The district is located in the south of the province, and borders with Chiuta District in the north, Moatize District in the east, Guro District of Manica Province in the south, Zimbabwe in the southwest, and with Cahora-Bassa District in the west. It has a population of 156,738 as of 2007.

Geography
The district is located at the right bank of the Zambezi.

According to the Köppen climate classification, the climate of the district is tropical dry (BSw).

Demographics
As of 2005, 51% of the population of the district was younger than 15 years. 29% of the population spoke Portuguese. The most common mothertongue among the population was Cinyungwe. 72% were analphabetic, mostly women.

Administrative divisions
The district is divided into three postos, Luenha (three localities), Chioco (three localities), and Mavara (three localities).

Economy
Less than 1% of the households in the district have access to electricity.

Agriculture
In the district, there are 29,000 farms which have on average  of land. The main agricultural products are corn, cassava, cowpea, peanut, and sweet potato.

Transportation

References

Districts in Tete Province